Ritual of Battle is the second studio album by underground hip hop collective Army of the Pharaohs. Released on September 25, 2007 under Babygrande Records, the album features group members Vinnie Paz, Jus Allah, OuterSpace, Chief Kamachi, Reef the Lost Cauze, Esoteric, Celph Titled, King Syze, Des Devious, Doap Nixon, Demoz, and King Magnetic. Although he was prominently featured on the group's debut album The Torture Papers, Apathy does not appear on Ritual of Battle. While still a member of the group, he explains on a MySpace blog that he was recording with Styles of Beyond in Los Angeles during the Army's album recording sessions. The rapper recorded for one song, titled "A.O.T.P.", produced by Snowgoons, but it was not included on the album. This song was included on the Apathy compilation Hell's Lost & Found: It's The Bootleg, Muthafu@kas! Volume 2.

The album's first single is "Bloody Tears", featuring Planetary, Doap Nixon, Demoz and Vinnie Paz and based on the Castlevania tune of the same name.

Track listing

Chorus / samples
"Swords Drawn"
"Suspiria" by Goblin from the album Suspiria
"Beneath the Planet of the Apes" sample.
"The Resurrected" sample.
"Time To Rock"
"Rhyme Tyme" by Kool G. Rap & DJ Polo from the album Rated XXX
"As The Rhyme Goes On" by Eric B. & Rakim from the album Paid in Full
"Put It On" by Big L from the album Lifestylez ov da Poor & Dangerous
"Parental Discretion" by Big Pun from the album Capital Punishment
"Mad Scientist" by Large Professor from the album The LP

"Dump the Clip"
"Godzilla Theme Tune" by Akira Ifukube from the movie Godzilla vs. Gigan
"Deathstalker" quote by Rick Hill 
Raiders of the Lost Ark sample

"Strike Back"
"Halftime" by Nas from the album Illmatic

"Don't Cry"
"Don't Cry, Baby" by Etta James from the album The Second Time Around

"Bloody Tears"
"Bloody Tears" by Kenichi Matsubara, Masahiro Ikariko, Kazuhiko Uehara and T-San from the game Castlevania II: Simon's Quest

References

2007 albums
Army of the Pharaohs albums
Babygrande Records albums